James Eric Bullinger (born August 21, 1965) is a former professional starting pitcher. He played for the Chicago Cubs (-), Montreal Expos and Seattle Mariners of Major League Baseball (MLB). He batted and threw right-handed. He is the brother of pitcher Kirk Bullinger. Jim Bullinger was converted to a pitcher in the Cubs' farm system, after initially playing as a shortstop.  He played for the University of New Orleans before going pro, where his team made it to the 1984 College World Series.

Career
He made his major league debut on May 27, 1992. On June 8 of that year, he hit a home run on the first pitch he faced in his first at-bat in the majors, one of only five pitchers to accomplish this feat.

In a seven-season career, Bullinger posted a 34–41 record with 392 strikeouts and a 5.06 ERA in 642.0 innings pitched.

He was a better than average hitting pitcher, batting .188 (31-for-165) with 14 runs, 9 doubles, 4 home runs, 19 RBI, 13 walks, 20 sacrifice hits and 2 sacrifice flies in 186 games.

He posted a perfect 1.000 fielding percentage, handling 171 total chances (72 putouts, 99 assists) without a miscue in his major league career.

References

External links
, or Retrosheet, or Pelota Binaria (Venezuelan Winter League)

1965 births
Living people
Adirondack Lumberjacks players
Águilas de Mexicali players
American expatriate baseball players in Canada
American expatriate baseball players in Mexico
Baseball players from New Orleans
Camden Riversharks players
Charlotte Knights players
Chicago Cubs players
Iowa Cubs players
Long Island Ducks players
Major League Baseball pitchers
Mexican League baseball pitchers
Memphis Redbirds players
Montreal Expos players
New Orleans Privateers baseball players
Newark Bears players
Orlando Cubs players
Pastora de los Llanos players
Petroleros de Cabimas players
Pittsfield Cubs players
Seattle Mariners players
Somerset Patriots players
Tacoma Rainiers players
Toros de Tijuana players
Vero Beach Dodgers players
Waterbury Spirit players
Winston-Salem Spirits players
American expatriate baseball players in Venezuela